Bill Nicholson (7 May 1909 – 10 April 2001) was a Scotland international cricketer. He also played rugby union and he became president of the Scottish Rugby Union in 1968-69.

Cricket career

In 1929, Nicholson scored a century on his debut for Scotland against Ireland in Dublin at the age of 20.

Rugby Union career

Amateur career

Nicholson played rugby for West of Scotland.

Provincial career

He was capped for Glasgow District and had a trial for the Scotland national rugby union team but was not selected.

Administrative career

With West of Scotland he was president from 1958 to 1976, coinciding with one of the club's most successful periods.

He served as president of the Scottish Rugby Union in 1968-69.

References

External links
Cricinfo player profile and statistics

1909 births
2001 deaths
People educated at Warriston School
People educated at Loretto School, Musselburgh
Scottish cricketers
Scottish rugby union players
Royal Naval Volunteer Reserve personnel of World War II
20th-century Scottish businesspeople
West of Scotland FC players
Glasgow District (rugby union) players
Presidents of the Scottish Rugby Union
Rugby union players from Dunoon